Mosel or Moselle is a town in Sheboygan County, Wisconsin, United States. The population was 839 at the 2000 census. The unincorporated communities of Haven, Hayen, and Mosel are located in the town. The town is included in the Sheboygan, Wisconsin Metropolitan Statistical Area.

Geography
According to the United States Census Bureau, the town has a total area of 21.1 square miles (54.8 km2), all of it land.

Demographics
As of the census of 2000, there were 839 people, 310 households, and 248 families residing in the town. The population density was 39.7 people per square mile (15.3/km2). There were 323 housing units at an average density of 15.3 per square mile (5.9/km2). The racial makeup of the town was 99.52% White, 0.12% African American, 0.12% Asian, and 0.24% from two or more races. Hispanic or Latino of any race were 0.60% of the population.

There were 310 households, out of which 28.7% had children under the age of 18 living with them, 73.2% were married couples living together, 4.2% had a female householder with no husband present, and 19.7% were non-families. 15.8% of all households were made up of individuals, and 7.4% had someone living alone who was 65 years of age or older. The average household size was 2.71 and the average family size was 3.00.

In the town, the population was spread out, with 23.4% under the age of 18, 5.8% from 18 to 24, 25.7% from 25 to 44, 33.4% from 45 to 64, and 11.7% who were 65 years of age or older. The median age was 42 years. For every 100 females, there were 103.1 males. For every 100 females age 18 and over, there were 108.1 males.

The median income for a household in the town was $55,833, and the median income for a family was $61,250. Males had a median income of $37,566 versus $25,446 for females. The per capita income for the town was $21,953. About 1.6% of families and 1.4% of the population were below the poverty line, including none of those under age 18 and 2.3% of those age 65 or over.

Recreation
The Whistling Straits golf course is in the town, in Haven.

Notable people

 Julius A. Furer, Rear admiral, U.S. Navy
 Herman Hedrich, Wisconsin State Representative and farmer, lived on a farm in the town

References

External links
Town of Mosel

Towns in Sheboygan County, Wisconsin
Towns in Wisconsin